Angelo Paternoster (February 20, 1919 – July 6, 2012) was an American football guard in the National Football League for the Washington Redskins. He was born in Passaic, New Jersey, and attended Georgetown University in Washington, D.C.  Paternoster ceased activities with the Redskins due to commitments with the United States Navy.  After World War II, Paternoster moved to Clifton, New Jersey and practiced dentistry.  He died on July 6, 2012.

References

1919 births
2012 deaths
American dentists
Georgetown Hoyas football players
Washington Redskins players
United States Navy officers
Sportspeople from Clifton, New Jersey
Sportspeople from Passaic, New Jersey
Players of American football from New Jersey
20th-century dentists
United States Navy personnel of World War II
Military personnel from New Jersey